Hyphessobrycon heterorhabdus, the Belgian flag tetra or flag tetra, is a species of characid fish from Brazil.

Description
This fish has an elongated and laterally compressed body, and has red-colored eyes and a lateral stripe composed of black, red, and yellow lines similar to the flag of Belgium.

References

Tetras
Fish of Brazil
Fish described in 1894
Taxa named by Albert B. Ulrey